Logan Park may refer to:
 Logan Park (Fresno), a residential park in Fresno, California
 Logan Park (Santa Ana) a neighborhood in Santa Ana, California
 Logan Park, Minneapolis a neighborhood in Minneapolis, Minnesota
 Logan Park, Dunedin a sports venue in New Zealand
 Logan Park High School, in Dunedin, New Zealand
 Logan Park Cemetery (Sioux City), located in Iowa
 Logan Park (high school student), located in Kentucky